The 1947 UCI Road World Championships took place on 3 August 1947 in Reims, France.

Events summary

References

 
UCI Road World Championships by year
W
R
R